Edgar Sinco Romero,  (July 7, 1924 – May 28, 2013), commonly known as Eddie Romero, was a Filipino film director, film producer and screenwriter.

Early life

Romero was born on July 7, 1924. His father was José E. Romero, the first Philippine Ambassador to the Court of St. James's. His mother was Pilar Guzman Sinco, a schoolteacher and the sister of University of the Philippines President Vicente G. Sinco who signed the United Nations Charter in 1945 on behalf of the Philippines. His brother was Jose V. Romero Jr., former Philippine Ambassador to Italy. He studied at Silliman University.

Romero's paternal grandparents were Francisco Romero Sr., mayor of Tanjay, Negros Oriental from 1909 to 1916 and later a member of the Provincial Board of Negros Oriental, and Josefa Calumpang Muñoz, daughter of Tanjay gobernadorcillo Don José Teves Muñoz and Doña Aleja Ines Calumpang, a great-granddaughter of Don Fernando Velaz de Medrano Bracamonte y Dávila (es), Marquis of Tabuérniga de Velazar (es), 15th Marquis of Cañete (GE) (es), 6th Marquis of Fuente el Sol (es), 8th Marquis of Navamorcuende (es), 15th Lord of Montalbo, and Knight of the Order of St. John.

Career

Romero was named National Artist of the Philippines in 2003, and his body of work delved into the history and politics of his country. His 1976 film Ganito Kami Noon…Paano Kayo Ngayon?, set at the turn of the 20th century during the revolution against the Spaniards and, later, the American colonizers, follows a naive peasant through his leap of faith to become a member of an imagined community. Aguila situated a family's story against the backdrop of Filipino history, while Kamakalawa explored the folklore of prehistoric Philippines. Banta ng Kahapon, his "small" political film, was set against the turmoil of the late 1960s, tracing the connection of the underworld to the corrupt halls of politics. His 13-part series Noli Me Tangere brought Philippine national hero José Rizal's novel to a new generation of viewers.

Romero co-produced one of the earliest Filipino horror films, the 1959 Terror Is a Man, which was directed by his friend and fellow director Gerardo de Leon, with whom he would later co-direct other films.  Romero directed some critically acclaimed war films in the early 1960s, such as Lost Battalion (1960), The Raiders of Leyte Gulf (1963) and The Walls of Hell (1964). Along with Filipino-language (Tagalog language) films, he made English-language films that became cult classics, like Black Mama, White Mama, Beast of the Yellow Night, The Woman Hunt, Beyond Atlantis and The Twilight People and worked with American actors like John Ashley and Pam Grier.

Romero's films, the National Artist citation stated, "are delivered in an utterly simple style – minimalist, but never empty, always calculated, precise and functional, but never predictable." Quentin Tarantino drew on Twilight People as an inspiration for his "grindhouse" homages.

Romero is especially known to horror film fans for his three "Blood Island" films from the late 1960s - Brides of Blood (1968), The Mad Doctor of Blood Island (1969) and Beast of Blood (1970), which he directed, co-produced by "Hemisphere Pictures" (which was composed of Romero, Kane W. Lynn and Irwin Pizor). Romero later called his American-financed "cult" films – including the "Blood Island" series – "the worst things I ever did". When the kung fu craze started in the 1970s, Romero turned his back on the international market for Filipino films which he had virtually created. After 1976, he made smaller, more personal "art" films in Filipino.

Personal life

Romero was married to Carolina Gonzalez (1922-2019). She was a great-granddaughter of Don Francisco Gonzalez y Reinado, owner of the legendary 39,000-hectare Hacienda Esperanza that included the municipalities of Santa Maria, Santo Tomas, Rosales and San Quintin, extending through the rest of Pangasinan and the provinces of Tarlac and Nueva Ecija. She was the first cousin of Francis Gonzalez Moran, father of 1973 Miss Universe Margarita Moran-Floirendo. Romero was also, for a time, the partner of actress Mila del Sol.

He had three children, including film director and former board member of the Movie and Television Review and Classification Board Jose "Joey" Gonzalez Romero IV.

Death

Romero died on May 28, 2013. He had been suffering from prostate cancer when he developed a blood clot in his brain

Filmography

Ang Maestra (1941) (writer)
Anong ganda mo (1941) (writer)
So long America (1946) (writer)
Isumpa mo giliw (1947) (writer)
Mameng, iniibig kita (1947) (writer, assistant director)
Si, si, señorito (1947) (writer)
La Paloma (1947) (writer)
Ang Kamay ng Diyos (1947) (director, writer)
Kaaway ng bayan (1947) (writer)
Hele hele bago quiere (1947) (writer)
Hindi kita malimot (1948) (director)
Selosa (1948) (director, writer)
Apoy sa langit (1949) (director)
Abogada (1949) (director)
Always kay ganda mo (1949) (director)
Sa piling mo (1949) (director)
Sipag ay yaman (1949) (writer)
Milagro ng birhen ng mga rosas (1949) (writer)
Camelia (1949) (writer)
Batalyon trece (1949) (writer)
Kasintahan sa pangarap (1951) (director)
Sabas, ang barbaro/ Sabas the Barbarian (1952) (director) based on a comic book character
Buhay alamang (1952) (director, writer)
Ang asawa kong Amerikana (1953) (director)
Ang ating pag-ibig (1953) (director)
El Indio (1953) (director)
Maldita (1953) (director)
May bakas ang lumipas (1954) (director)
The Day of the Trumpet (1957) (director, writer)
The Kidnappers (1958) (director)
The Scavengers (1959) (co-producer, writer)
Terror Is a Man (1959) (co-producer)
Espionage: Far East (1961) (director)
Lost Battalion (1960) (producer, director, writer)
Pitong gabi sa Paris/ Seven Nights in Paris  (1960) (director)
The Raiders of Leyte Gulf (1963) (producer, director)
Cavalry Command (1963) a.k.a. The Day of the Trumpet (director, writer)
The Walls of Hell (1964) a.k.a. Intramuros (producer, director) 
Moro Witch Doctor (1964) aka Amuck (producer, director, writer)
Flight to Fury (1964) (producer, director of alternate Tagalog version only, titled Cordillera)
The Ravagers (1965) a.k.a. Hanggang may kalaban (producer, director, writer)
The Passionate Strangers (1968)(director, writer) 
Manila, Open City (1968) (producer, director, writer) 
Brides of Blood (1968) (producer, director)
The Mad Doctor of Blood Island (1969) (producer, director)
Beast of Blood (1970) a.k.a. Beast of the Dead (US: TV title), a.k.a. Blood Devils (UK)(producer, director, writer) 
Beast of the Yellow Night (1971) (producer, director, writer) 
Black Mama, White Mama (1972) (producer, director)
The Twilight People (1972) a.k.a. Beasts, a.k.a. Island of the Twilight People (producer, director, writer) 
The Woman Hunt (1973) (producer, director)
Beyond Atlantis (1973) (producer, director)
Savage Sisters (1974) (producer, director)
Ganito kami noon, paano kayo ngayon (1976) (director, screenplay) 
Sudden Death (1977) (director)
Sinong kapiling? Sinong kasiping? (1977) (director, writer) 
Banta ng kahapon (1977) (director, writer) 
Durugin si Totoy Bato (1979) (screenplay)
Aguila (1980) (director, screenplay, producer)
Palaban (1980) (director)
Kamakalawa (1981) (director, writer) 
Desire (1982) (director)
Ang Padrino (1984) (screenplay)
Hari sa hari, lahi sa lahi (1987) a.k.a. King and Emperor (International: English title) (director, writer) 
A Case of Honor (1988) (director)
Whiteforce (1988) (director)
Noli Me Tangere (1993) (director)
Faces of Love (2006) (director)
Teach Me to Love (2008) (director)

Awards and nominations
In 2003, Romero was awarded the National Artist Award by the Philippine government for his contribution to Philippine cinema and broadcast arts. Earlier in 1991, he was awarded the Gawad CCP para sa Sining. In 2004, he was also awarded the Cinemanila Lifetime Achievement Award.

See also
Cinema of the Philippines
Filipino Academy of Movie Arts and Sciences Award
List of Silliman University people
List of University of the Philippines people
National Artists of the Philippines

References

External links

Filipino film directors
Filipino film producers
Filipino screenwriters
1924 births
2013 deaths
University of the Philippines alumni
Silliman University alumni
Deaths from prostate cancer
People from Dumaguete